"Trouble with a Heartbreak" is a song written by Brett Beavers, John Morgan, Kurt Allison, and Tully Kennedy, and recorded by American country music artist Jason Aldean. It was released on January 14, 2022 as the second single from Aldean's tenth studio album Macon, Georgia.

Background 
Billy Dukes of Taste of Country wrote that the song "recalls slower songs" from Aldean's "My Kinda Party and Night Train era, but there's a drop of R&B production that makes one think of They Don't Know, his most progressive album to date," while also hinting it recalls "heartbreak as something of a bruise that is very slow to heal; everyone has advice on how to "move on," but none of it is any good." The song is a single from Aldean's tenth album Macon, Georgia, a two-disc release.

Content 
Aldean stated in a press release, “This song hit me right when I heard it, and reminded me of those bitter R&B breakup songs that take me back to riding through the backroads of Georgia.”

Critical reception 
BJ Mac of The Nash News wrote that "rather than an angry moving-on song or a wallowing-in-sorrow ballad, “Trouble With a Heartbreak” refreshingly honors the feelings of grief that follow a break-up in an honest and reinvigorating way." An uncredited review from Off the Record UK called it "a haunting track that showcases a more vulnerable side to Aldean’s musicality."

Upon its release, "Trouble with a Heartbreak" was added to the playlists of 84 country music radio stations surveyed by Mediabase, making it the most-added new song for the week of January 18, 2022.

Music video
The song's music video was also released after the single was sent to radio. Directed in December 2021 by Shaun Silva, the video features concert footage from Aldean's three-day concert at the Park Theater in Las Vegas, Nevada, interspersed with footage of a cowboy at the National Finals Rodeo in the same city.

Charts

Weekly charts

Year-end charts

Release history

References 

2022 songs
2022 singles
Jason Aldean songs
BBR Music Group singles
Song recordings produced by Michael Knox (record producer)
Songs written by Brett Beavers
Music videos directed by Shaun Silva